DSP1 or DSP-1 may refer to:

 AT&T DSP1
 DSP (Nintendo)
 Yamaha DSP-1